Deportivo Tintaya is a Peruvian association football club, playing in the city of Yauri, Cusco.

The club were founded 2 May 1972 and play in the Copa Perú which is the third division of the Peruvian league.

History
In the 1986 Copa Perú, the club qualified for the Final Stage, but was eliminated by Deportivo Cañaña, Félix Donayre, Deportivo Camaná, and Chanchamayo.

The club have played at the highest level of Peruvian football on two occasions, from 1988 Torneo Descentralizado until 1989 Torneo Descentralizado when was relegated.

Honours

Regional
Región VII: 0
Runner-up (1): 1999

Liga Departamental del Cusco: 1
Winners (1): 1985

Liga Distrital de Espinar: 0
Runner-up (1): 2012

See also
List of football clubs in Peru
Peruvian football league system

External links
 Sin Paradero: Un cusqueño más - DeChalaca.com
 Tinta en cuarentena

Football clubs in Peru
1972 establishments in Peru
Association football clubs established in 1972